Richard Stanley is a South African filmmaker, known for his work in the horror genre. He began his career making short films and music videos, and subsequently directed the feature films Hardware (1990) and Dust Devil (1992), both of which are considered cult classics. He was the original director of The Island of Dr. Moreau (1996), but was fired early into principal photography due to creative differences, an episode recounted in the 2014 documentary Lost Soul: The Doomed Journey of Richard Stanley's Island of Dr. Moreau. In 2019, he returned to feature films after more than 20 years, directing the H. P. Lovecraft adaptation Color Out of Space.

Career

Early career (1983–1987)
Stanley's first foray into film making began in high school where he joined the Young Filmmaker's Workshop. Here he created his first film, Rites of Passage. Shot on super-8 stock, the 10-minute short film draws comparisons between modern man and primitive man. The short eventually won Stanley the IAC International Student Film Trophy film award in 1984.

Stanley followed his first success with the ambitious 45-minute 8 mm short Incidents in an Expanding Universe. Set in a future dystopia, the film laid the groundwork for Stanley's cyberpunk feature debut Hardware. It won the IAC Gold Seal Award and was eventually made available on the Severin DVD release of Hardware.

In the mid-1980s, Stanley began work on two more shorts. In a Season of Soft Rains was another futuristic journey, but a majority of the footage has been lost. Dust Devil was his first work on 16 mm. Inspired by a series of unsolved murders in Namibia, this short was unfinished but footage can be viewed on the Subversive Cinema DVD release of the feature Dust Devil.

Music videos (1987–1990)
Following the move to London, England, Stanley began working in music videos in 1987. He directed videos for bands including Fields of the Nephilim, Pop Will Eat Itself, and Renegade Soundwave.

In the late 1980s Stanley traveled to Afghanistan to document the Soviet–Afghan War. Stanley and his crew witnessed the Soviet Army's withdrawal and the country's slide into the civil war that would bring the Taliban to power. The resulting documentary, Voice of the Moon, is a 30-minute look at the daily lives of the Afghan people trying to survive. Stanley was present at the siege of Jalalabad, and the events surrounding his escape from the country, along with his wounded camera man, Immo Horn, later formed the basis of the screenplay Addicted to Danger, by Sebastian Junger. The documentary is available on the Subversive Cinema DVD release of the feature Dust Devil.

Mainstream breakthrough (1990–1996)

Stanley made his feature film directing debut with the post-apocalyptic science fiction film Hardware in 1990. The film included cameos by musicians Iggy Pop, Carl McCoy and Lemmy. Shot for approximately £960,000, it was eventually picked up by the Weinstein brothers and released theatrically in the United States through their early Millimeter Films division.

Stanley returned to his South African roots with the supernatural horror film Dust Devil in 1992. The full director's cut was officially released on DVD by Subversive Cinema in September 2006.

In 1994, Stanley directed a 50-minute length video for Marillion's concept album, Brave, which has since been released on DVD. He would later disown the end result, claiming the material was re-edited to cover the overall running time without his consent.

The Island of Dr. Moreau (1996)

Stanley's next project was the third major movie version of the H.G. Wells novel The Island of Doctor Moreau for New Line Cinema in 1996. An ambitious project attempting to stay true to the source material, the film's production was fraught with problems from the start, with Stanley being undercut by his belligerent lead actors, suspicious studio and a sudden burst of bad weather; he was fired and replaced by John Frankenheimer a week after shooting began. The details of Stanley's involvement in the film, which ultimately veered far from his original vision, are captured in the 2014 documentary Lost Soul: The Doomed Journey of Richard Stanley's Island of Dr. Moreau.

Indie film writing and documentaries (1996–2019)

Stanley completed The Secret Glory – an examination of SS officer Otto Rahn's search for the Holy Grail – in 2001 and The White Darkness – a look at the voodoo practices in Haiti – in 2002. Following several festival screenings, both documentaries appeared in the Dust Devil DVD box-set, released by Subversive Cinema in 2006.

Stanley's cinematic efforts include a number of short films. Children of the Kingdom appeared in the short-film collection Europe - 99euro-films 2 in 2003. The science fiction story The Sea of Perdition premiered in October 2006 at the Festival de Cine de Sitges, and has since been made available online and on the 2009 Severin DVD release of Hardware. The werewolf short Black Tulips premiered online in September 2008.

Stanley was a contributing writer-director to the 2011 omnibus The Theatre Bizarre, with an adaptation of the short story "Mother of Toads" by Clark Ashton Smith.

In addition to directing, Stanley has continued working as a screenwriter. He co-wrote the script for Nacho Cerdà's feature debut The Abandoned (2006) and delivered the screenplay for Cerdà's upcoming comic book adaptation I Am Legion (2012). In addition, Stanley was a script collaborator on the Italian horror-thriller Imago Mortis (2009). Stanley also co-wrote an unmade film adaptation of J. G. Ballard's High Rise with director Vincenzo Natali.

Stanley launched the interactive website Terra Umbra – Empire of Shadows in October 2009, an ongoing inquiry into the invisible world and the hidden history of southern and central Europe. He also released the e-book Shadow of the Grail – Magic and Mystery at Montsegur in December 2010.

In early 2012, it was announced that Stanley would collaborate on the anthology film The Profane Exhibit. Stanley's contribution will be the short Coltan, which is described as "an unflinching look into darkest Africa."

Return to mainstream (2018–present)
In December 2018, it was announced Stanley was returning to film with an adaptation of The Colour Out of Space with Nicolas Cage set to star. The film, Color Out of Space, was released in 2020 and became a critical success with Stanley being praised for his return.

In a Q&A session upon the release of the film, Stanley revealed it was the first in a trilogy of H.P. Lovecraft adaptations, and that he was currently writing an adaptation of The Dunwich Horror.

Abuse allegation
In March 2021, screenwriter Scarlett Amaris, who previously collaborated with Stanley on several projects, alleged in a blog post that she had been in an abusive relationship with him. Subsequently SpectreVision, which produced Color Out of Space, announced it would no longer work with Stanley and that all future revenue from the film would be donated to anti-domestic violence charities.

On October 25, 2021, entertainment news outlet Deadline reported Stanley has filed criminal complaints for libel and harassment in response to the accusation.

Filmography

Feature film

Short films

Documentary films

Interviewee
 Jodorowsky's Dune (2013)
 Lost Soul: The Doomed Journey of Richard Stanley's Island of Dr. Moreau (2014)
 78/52 The Hitchcock Shower Scene (2017)

References

External links

Interviews
Unfilmable's 2010 interview with Stanley
Richard Stanley & co-directors talk The Theatre Bizarre
Not Coming to a Theater Near You interview with Stanley
The Quietus interview
Sci-Fi Bulletin interview
 Hardware, Dust Devil and Vacation interview
"Return to The Island of Dr. Moreau"

Living people
Horror film directors
South African music video directors
South African film directors
White South African people
Year of birth missing (living people)